GuiXT is a software component which allows the customization of the SAP user interface. It was developed as a standalone solution in 1998 by Synactive GmbH, Germany, and shortly thereafter integrated into SAP GUI by SAP.

Additional tools based on GuiXT are offered by Synactive GmbH (InputAssistant, GuiXT Controls, GuiXT Script Editor Pro) and by Synactive, Inc., a US firm headquartered in Foster City, California (GuiXT Designer, Liquid UI).

Synactive GmbH was founded in 1998 by Dr. Gerhard Rodé. Synactive Inc. was founded in 1998 by Thomas Ewe.

References 
 SAP documentation on GuiXT 

SAP SE